Joseph Edward Borchard (born November 25, 1978) is an American former Major League Baseball (MLB) outfielder. Borchard was the 12th pick of the first round in the 2000 Major League Baseball Draft out of Stanford University by the Chicago White Sox. In high school, he won a division III state football championship at Adolfo Camarillo High School as the starting quarterback. He also played quarterback for Stanford and took a $5.3 million signing bonus to play for the White Sox.

College
Borchard attended Stanford University where he played baseball as an outfielder and football as a quarterback.

Football

In 1998 Borchard was the Cardinal backup quarterback behind Todd Husak and played in seven games in which he tallied 317 yards and three touchdowns. In 1999 Borchard completed 42-of-71 passes for 747 yards and seven touchdowns and led the Pac-10 with a 177.3 pass efficiency rating, but did not have enough attempts to qualify for the national statistics. He made national headlines after his performance against UCLA in a relief role after Husak left the game with bruised ribs early in the second quarter.  Borchard came on and threw for 324 yards and five touchdowns and was named USA Today's National Player of the Week for his effort. The five TD passes in a game tied Borchard with several others for the second most in school history. The following week, with Husak sidelined, Borchard made his starting debut against San Jose State and threw for 313 yards and two touchdowns and also rushed for one score.

Baseball

Joe was a twice named to the First-Team All-Pac-10 in 1999 and 2000.  Stanford's website  claims him to be "among the best players in the history of Stanford baseball." In three seasons, he hit 40 home runs with 187 RBI and a .346 batting average. In the Cardinal record book, he ranks eighth in home runs and batting average and ninth in RBI.

Professional baseball
Borchard's career with the White Sox was less than impressive, as he struggled to make consistent contact, an issue that plagued him throughout his career. Borchard's most significant big league playing time came in the  season, where he received 201 at-bats. He hit .174 that year with 9 home runs and 20 RBI. Borchard's most notable feat was setting the US Cellular Field home run distance record, yet to be eclipsed at 504 feet off Philadelphia Phillies pitcher Brett Myers.

Borchard was traded to the Seattle Mariners on March 20, for Matt Thornton, a left-handed relief pitcher. On May 3, 2006, the Florida Marlins claimed Borchard off waivers.

The Atlanta Braves signed Borchard to a minor league contract during the 2007 MLB winter meetings in Nashville, Tennessee.

On May 28, Borchard had season ending Tommy John surgery, but was re-signed by the Braves for the  season. However, on April 24, Borchard was released.

On May 28, 2009 Borchard signed with the Giants. He played for the organization's AAA affiliate, the Fresno Grizzlies, for the next two years. On May 3, 2010, he became the second Grizzly to hit for the cycle (joining Nate Schierholtz) when he went five for six in the Grizzlies' 14–4 victory over the Colorado Springs Sky Sox.

On March 25, 2011 Borchard signed with the Bridgeport Bluefish of the Atlantic League of Professional Baseball.  On June 2, 2011, he announced his retirement from baseball.

Personal life
Born in the Panorama City neighborhood of Los Angeles, Borchard attended Adolfo Camarillo High School in Camarillo, California. He has 2 children and lives in Ventura county. His sister Julie played college softball at the University of Wisconsin from 1995-1999. She played shortstop.

References

External links

College Football Statistics

1978 births
Living people
Chicago White Sox players
Seattle Mariners players
Florida Marlins players
Baseball players from Los Angeles
Major League Baseball outfielders
Major League Baseball right fielders
People from Camarillo, California
Stanford Cardinal baseball players
Stanford Cardinal football players
Arizona League White Sox players
Winston-Salem Warthogs players
Birmingham Barons players
Charlotte Knights players
Albuquerque Isotopes players
Richmond Braves players
Fresno Grizzlies players
Gwinnett Braves players
Bridgeport Bluefish players
People from Panorama City, Los Angeles
Sportspeople from Ventura County, California
American expatriate baseball players in the Dominican Republic
Estrellas Orientales players